Stockport is an unincorporated community in Washington Township, Delaware County, Indiana.

History
A post office was established at Stockport in 1892, and remained in operation until it was discontinued in 1914.

Stockport was a station on the railroad. It was likely named for its livestock trade.

Geography

References

Unincorporated communities in Delaware County, Indiana
Unincorporated communities in Indiana